Stekolny is an urban locality (an urban-type settlement) in Khasynsky District of Magadan Oblast, Russia. Population:

Geography

References

Urban-type settlements in Magadan Oblast